Figment: The Imagination Processor is a software published by Patch Panel Software.

Description
Figment: The Imagination Processor is a software package which includes templates that can be used for creating adventures.

Reception
Scorpia reviewed the software for Computer Gaming World, and stated that it has "the means to jump between the game and the editor to make changes "on the fly". This is a handy feature, as you don't have to stop the game to fix problems and then recompile and re-run the program."

Reviews
The Computer Journal

References

Video game development software